Roberto López Esquiroz (born 4 June 1987), commonly known as Rúper, is a Spanish professional footballer who plays for CD Izarra as a defensive midfielder.

Club career
Rúper was born in Estella-Lizarra, Navarre. A product of CA Osasuna's youth ranks, he made his first-team debut on 26 April 2009, playing the last two minutes of a 0–0 away draw against Real Valladolid. During his first full season, as they easily avoided La Liga relegation, he provided rest for longtime incumbent holding midfielder Francisco Puñal (12 years his senior).

Rúper spent 2011–12 on loan to Elche CF of Segunda División, appearing in less than half of the games during the campaign – 12 starts, 1,190 minutes of action. He was released by Osasuna in the summer of 2013 after a loan to CD Mirandés in the same league, and continued competing at that level with CE Sabadell FC, Real Jaén and Mirandés again.

Rúper signed for CD Tudelano on 17 January 2019, on a six-month loan. In the ensuing off-season, the free agent joined his former youth club CD Izarra also in the third tier.

Career statistics

Club

References

External links

1987 births
Living people
People from Estella Oriental
Spanish footballers
Footballers from Navarre
Association football midfielders
La Liga players
Segunda División players
Segunda División B players
Segunda Federación players
CD Izarra footballers
CA Osasuna B players
CA Osasuna players
Elche CF players
CD Mirandés footballers
CE Sabadell FC footballers
Real Jaén footballers
CD Tudelano footballers